Geschwader Fledermaus (Bat squadron) is an East German film. It was released in 1958.

Cast
 Wolfgang Heinz – General Lee
 Christine Laszar – Flessy
 Günther Simon – Tex Stankowsky
 Kurd Pieritz – Mitch Bryk
 Norbert Christian – Terry Varney
 Hans-Walter Clasen – Andy West
 Werner Lierck – Sam Kirby
 Otto Stark – Leo Cayman
 Gerhard Frei – Percy Brown
 Horst Schön – Smart Lewis
 Dom de Beern – John Cainfield
 Wolf Martini – Colonel D'Allard
 Thi Hoa Nguyen – Thao
 Benno Bentzin	– Lieutenant Matthieu
 Johannes Knittel – Lieutenant Lambert

External links
 

1958 films
East German films
1950s German-language films
First Indochina War films
German aviation films
Films with screenplays by Hans Székely
1950s German films
German war films